Anand is a 1986 Indian Kannada-language film directed by Singeetham Srinivasa Rao. It stars Shiva Rajkumar and Sudha Rani with both making their debuts. The film went on to be a huge success running for 38 weeks.

Shiva Rajkumar is introduced as an actor and a dancer in this film. This was his first of the three consecutive hits at the box-office on debut which gave him the title Hat-trick Hero. He once said, "I can never forget Anand, my first film which made me an actor. Singeetam was just explaining the scene to us and was telling this is what the work I expect from you people. He was bringing out such better performance from all of us."

Cast

Shiva Rajkumar as Anand
Sudha Rani as Mala
Rajesh as Rajachandrashekhar
Tara
Shubha as Kumuda
Jayanthi as Anand's mother
Thoogudeepa Srinivas as Prajakoogu editor Narahari
Chi. Udaya Shankar
Guru Dutt as Shrikanth
Kumari Nayana
Balaraj
Honnavalli Krishna
Chi. Ravishankar
Go.Ra.Bheemarao
Ashish Vidyarthi in an uncredited role

Soundtrack

The music is composed by the duo Shankar–Ganesh with lyrics by Chi. Udayashankar.

Awards
Karnataka State Film Award for Best Supporting Actress - Jayanthi
Karnataka State Film Award for Best Screenplay - Singeetham Srinivasa Rao, Chi. Udaya Shankar
Filmfare Award for Best Actor – Kannada - Shiva Rajkumar

References

External links

1980s Kannada-language films
Films scored by Shankar–Ganesh
Films directed by Singeetam Srinivasa Rao